The 11th Pan American Games were held in Havana, Cuba from August 2 to August 18, 1991.

Results by event

See also
Grenada at the 1992 Summer Olympics

References

Nations at the 1991 Pan American Games
Pan American Games
1991